Greenbush is a census-designated place located in the town of Greenbush, Sheboygan County, Wisconsin, United States.

Description

Greenbush has a post office with ZIP code 53026. As of the 2010 census, its population was 162. The Sylvanus Wade House is located in Greenbush.

See also
 List of census-designated places in Wisconsin

References

External links

Census-designated places in Sheboygan County, Wisconsin
Census-designated places in Wisconsin